The 2020 Copa Sudamericana first stage was played from 4 to 27 February 2020. A total of 44 teams competed in the first stage to decide 22 of the 32 places in the second stage of the 2020 Copa Sudamericana.

Draw

The draw for the first stage was held on 17 December 2019, 20:30 PYST (UTC−3), at the CONMEBOL Convention Centre in Luque, Paraguay. For the first stage, the teams were divided into two pots according to their geographical zones:
Pot A (South Zone): 22 teams from Argentina, Bolivia, Chile, Paraguay, and Uruguay
Pot B (North Zone): 22 teams from Brazil, Colombia, Ecuador, Peru, and Venezuela

The 44 teams were drawn into 22 ties (E1–E22) between a team from Pot A and a team from Pot B, with the teams from Pot B hosting the second leg in odd-numbered ties, and the teams from Pot A hosting the second leg in even-numbered ties. This distribution ensured that teams from the same association could not be drawn into the same tie.

Notes

Format

In the first stage, each tie was played on a home-and-away two-legged basis. If tied on aggregate, the away goals rule was used. If still tied, extra time was not played, and a penalty shoot-out was used to determine the winner (Regulations Article 2.4.2).

The 22 winners of the first stage advanced to the second stage to join the 10 teams transferred from the Copa Libertadores (two best teams eliminated in the third stage of qualifying and eight third-placed teams in the group stage).

Matches
The first legs were played on 4–6 and 11–13 February, and the second legs were played on 18–20 and 25–27 February 2020.

|}

Match E1

Coquimbo Unido won 3–1 on aggregate and advanced to the second stage.

Match E2

Vasco da Gama won 1–0 on aggregate and advanced to the second stage.

Match E3

Emelec won 5–0 on aggregate and advanced to the second stage.

Match E4

Plaza Colonia won 3–1 on aggregate and advanced to the second stage.

Match E5

Tied 2–2 on aggregate, Melgar won on penalties and advanced to the second stage.

Match E6

River Plate won 3–1 on aggregate and advanced to the second stage.

Match E7

Unión won 3–2 on aggregate and advanced to the second stage.

Match E8

Bahia won 6–1 on aggregate and advanced to the second stage.

Match E9

Fénix won 3–2 on aggregate and advanced to the second stage.

Match E10

Atlético Nacional won 4–1 on aggregate and advanced to the second stage.

Match E11

Sol de América won 2–0 on aggregate and advanced to the second stage.

Match E12

Sportivo Luqueño won 5–4 on aggregate and advanced to the second stage.

Match E13

Tied 2–2 on aggregate, Vélez Sarsfield won on away goals and advanced to the second stage.

Match E14

Millonarios won 2–1 on aggregate and advanced to the second stage.

Match E15

Lanús won 3–2 on aggregate and advanced to the second stage.

Match E16

Deportivo Cali won 5–2 on aggregate and advanced to the second stage.

Match E17

Tied 1–1 on aggregate, Sport Huancayo won on away goals and advanced to the second stage.

Match E18

Tied 1–1 on aggregate, Unión La Calera won on away goals and advanced to the second stage.

Match E19

Huachipato won 2–0 on aggregate and advanced to the second stage.

Match E20

Audax Italiano won 3–2 on aggregate and advanced to the second stage.

Match E21

Tied 2–2 on aggregate, Independiente won on away goals and advanced to the second stage.

Match E22

Liverpool won 7–0 on aggregate and advanced to the second stage.

Notes

References

External links
CONMEBOL Sudamericana 2020, CONMEBOL.com

1
February 2020 sports events in South America